San Jerónimo Tlacochahuaya is a town and municipality in the Mexican state of Oaxaca, 21 km from the city of Oaxaca on Federal Highway 190 between Santa Maria del Tule and Mitla. 
It is part of the Tlacolula District in the east of the Valles Centrales Region. 
The name Tlacochahuaya  comes from Nahuatl and means “in wet land” or “in the swamp.”

The town

Tradition states that the town was founded by a Zapotec warrior by the name of Cochicahuala, which means “he who fights by night”. After the Conquest the land was granted to Señor Don Gaspar Calderón and the area was evangelized by the Dominicans.

Its main church is the Templo de San Jerónimo, which was built along with a monastery at the end of the 16th century.  It has notable altarpieces (retablos) and an organ that dates from colonial times.  Normally they let visitors climb the massive structure to look closer.  The organ was built between 1725 and 1730 and restored in 1990-1991.  It is registered with the Instituto de Órganos Históricos de Oaxaca (Institute of Historic Organs of Oaxaca).

The municipality
The main economic activities are agriculture (corn, garlic, beans and various fruits), dairy farming and the production of mezcal.  As municipal seat, San Jerónimo Tlacochahuaya has governing jurisdiction over the following communities:
La Loma, Luis Alonso León, Macuilxóchitl de Artigas Carranza and Ojo de Agua.

References

External links
 Santos in Oaxaca's Ancient Churches: San Jerónimo Tlacochahuaya - Art-historical study of the santos (statues of saints) in the church.

Municipalities of Oaxaca